Euthalia irrubescens  is a butterfly of the family Nymphalidae (Limenitidinae). It is endemic to China and Taiwan (E. i. fulguralis (Matsumura, 1909))

References

Butterflies described in 1893
irrubescens